Levente Riz (2 December 1974 – 19 September 2019) was a Hungarian educator and politician, member of the National Assembly (MP) for Rákosmente (Budapest Constituency XXV) from 2010 to 2014. He was the mayor of Rákosmente (District XVII, Budapest) since October 1, 2006. He was a member of the Economic and Information Technology Committee from 14 May 2010 to 5 May 2014.

On 13 August 2019, Riz announced that he would not run as a candidate for mayor of Rákosmente in the 2019 Hungarian local elections, citing health issues. He died on 19 September 2019, aged 44.

References

1974 births
2019 deaths
Hungarian educators
Hungarian political scientists
Mayors of places in Hungary
Fidesz politicians
Members of the National Assembly of Hungary (2010–2014)
Politicians from Budapest
Eötvös Loránd University alumni